The 1908 United States presidential election in North Carolina took place on November 3, 1908. All contemporary 46 states were part of the 1908 United States presidential election. North Carolina voters chose 12 electors to the Electoral College, which selected the president and vice president.

North Carolina was won by the Democratic nominees, former Representative William Jennings Bryan of Nebraska and his running mate John W. Kern of Indiana. Although, like all former Confederate states, North Carolina would during its “Redemption” develop a politics based upon Jim Crow laws, disfranchisement of its African-American population and dominance of the Democratic Party, the Republican Party possessed sufficient historic Unionist white support from the mountains and northwestern Piedmont to gain a stable one-third of the statewide vote total in general elections even after blacks lost the right to vote. After the failure of Theodore Roosevelt to reconcile with the South, new nominee Taft would in October become the first Republican candidate to tour the South. Aided by opposition by developing manufacturers to Bryan’s populism, and by his willingness to accept black disfranchisement Taft gained substantially upon Theodore Roosevelt’s performance in 1904, especially in previously Democratic western and Piedmont counties. He was the first Republican to ever carry Cabarrus County and Catawba County – which would become solidly Republican after World War I and among thirteen Tar Heel counties to back Barry Goldwater over Lyndon Johnson – and also Jackson County.

Results

Results by county

References

Notes

North Carolina
1908
1908 North Carolina elections